Novenia is a genus of flowering plants in the tribe Astereae within the family Asteraceae. It is monotypic, being represented by the single species Novenia tunariensis, which is native to Argentina (Salta) and Peru (Lima, Ancash, Puno, Cajamarca, Pasco, Cuzco. La Libertad, Huánuco, Junín).

References

Monotypic Asteraceae genera
Flora of South America
Astereae